Josseline Gaël (born Jeannine Augustine Jeanne Blanleuil; 4 February 1917 – 10 August 1995) was a French actress who specialised in comedy roles. She is best remembered for her portrayal of Cosette in the 1934 film adaptation of Les Misérables. Her daughter with Jules Berry, Michèle, became a renowned art dealer.

Partial filmography

 Le stigmate (1924) as Gaby
 Simone (1926) as Simone enfant
 Une femme a menti (1930) as Jacqueline Chapelain
 Love Songs (1930) as Simone Crespin
 Les amours de minuit (1931) as Fanny
 The Man at Midnight (1931) as Arlette
 All That's Not Worth Love (1931) as Claire
 Baleydier (1932) as Lola
 Pour un sou d'amour (1932) as Françoise
 Monsieur de Pourceaugnac (1932) as Julie
 Happy Hearts (1932) as Lucette
 The Abbot Constantine (1933) as Bettina Perceval
 Tambour battant (1933) as Anneliese
 Les Misérables (1934) as Cosette
 A Man of Gold (1934) as Marcelle
 Le bossu (1934) as Aurore de Caylus
 Les hommes de la côte (1934) as Janick
 Le monde où l'on s'ennuie (1935) as Suzanne de Villiers
 Monsieur Sans-Gêne (1935) as Monique Perrochin
 Jeunes filles à marier (1935) as Simone Guéneau
 Pluie d'or (1935) as Rose
 L'enfant du Danube (1936) as Hélène
 Monsieur Personne (1936) as Josette Verneau
 La madone de l'atlantique (1936) as Yvonne Dorland
 Wells in Flames (1937) as Mirka
 Un déjeuner de soleil (1937) as Evelyne
 My Little Marquise (1937) as Monique Cormier
 Un scandale aux galeries (1937) as Laurence Coulaines
 Les deux combinards (1938) as Lucette
 Le monsieur de 5 heures (1938) as Madeleine Précardan
 Les femmes collantes (1938) as Eloïse Duboucher
 Barnabé (1938) as Mado
 Le plus beau gosse de France (1938) as Janine Pinsonnet
 Remontons les Champs-Élysées (1938) as Léone
 Grand-père (1939) as Solange Lavigne
 His Uncle from Normandy (1939) as Brigitte
 Face au destin (1940) as L'amie de Claude
 L'an 40 (1941) as Lucie
 Un chapeau de paille d'Italie (1941) as Anaïs Beauperthuis
 Chambre 13 (1942) as Geneviève d'Antibes
 La neige sur les pas (1942) as Simone Norans
 La Main du diable (1943) as Irène
 Une vie de chien (1943) as Émilie Calumet
 The Midnight Sun (1943) as La princesse Armide Irénieff
 The Island of Love (1944) as Xénia (final film role)

Bibliography
 Crisp, Colin. Genre, Myth and Convention in the French Cinema 1929-1939. Indiana University Press, 2002.

External links

Profile, CinéRessources.net; accessed 26 August 2015. 

1917 births
1995 deaths
French child actresses
French film actresses
Actresses from Paris
French silent film actresses
20th-century French actresses